Lower Heterobranchia, also known as the Allogastropoda, is a group of rather specialized, highly evolved sea slugs and sea snails, (marine gastropod mollusks) within the subclass Heterobranchia. 

Although the great majority of Lower Heterobranchs are indeed marine, a few have succeeded in making the transition to freshwater.

Description
The shell shapes in this group are typically those that are seen in the sundial, pyramid, rissoella and orbitestellid families of snails.

Taxonomy

2005 taxonomy 
In the taxonomy of the Gastropoda by Bouchet & Rocroi, 2005, the Lower Heterobranchia is an Informal Group. Superfamilies within the Lower Heterobranchia include:

Unassigned to a superfamily (orbitestellid-shells)
 Family Cimidae
 † Family Dolomitellidae
 † Family Heterosubulitidae
 † Family Kuskokwimiidae
 † Family Misurinellidae
Family Orbitestellidae
Family Tjaernoeiidae
Family Xylodisculidae
 superfamily Acteonoidea
 superfamily Architectonicoidea
 superfamily Glacidorboidea
 superfamily Mathildoidea
 † superfamily Nerineoidea
 superfamily Omalogyroidea
 superfamily Pyramidelloidea
 superfamily Ringiculoidea
 superfamily Rissoelloidea
 † superfamily Streptacidoidea
 superfamily Valvatoidea

(Taxa that are exclusively fossil are indicated with a dagger †)

For a more detailed taxonomy see: Taxonomy of the Gastropoda (Bouchet & Rocroi, 2005)#Informal group "Lower Heterobranchia" (= Allogastropoda)

2010 taxonomy 
Jörger et al. (2010) have redefined major groups within the Heterobranchia: they moved Glacidorboidea and Pyramidelloidea to Panpulmonata.

2014 taxonomy 
Wägele et al. (2014): moved Rissoelloidea and Acteonoidea from Lower Heterobranchia to Euthyneura.

2016 taxonomy 
Kano et al. (2016): moved Ringiculoidea from Lower Heterobranchia to Euthyneura.

So the following taxa remain within the Lower Heterobranchia:
Unassigned to a superfamily (orbitestellid-shells)
 Family Cimidae
 † Family Dolomitellidae
 † Family Heterosubulitidae
 † Family Kuskokwimiidae
 † Family Misurinellidae
Family Orbitestellidae
Family Tjaernoeiidae
Family Xylodisculidae
 superfamily Architectonicoidea
 superfamily Mathildoidea
 † superfamily Nerineoidea
 superfamily Omalogyroidea
 † superfamily Streptacidoidea
 superfamily Valvatoidea

References